Bang Phut is one of the twelve subdistricts (tambon) of Pak Kret District, in Nonthaburi Province, Thailand. The subdistrict is bounded by (clockwise from north) Bang Khu Wat, Bang Khayaeng, Ban Mai, Khlong Kluea, Pak Kret and Bang Tanai subdistricts. In 2020 it had a total population of 63,160 people.

Administration

Central administration
The subdistrict is subdivided into 9 villages (muban).

Local administration
The whole area of the subdistrict is covered by Pak Kret City Municipality.

References

External links
Website of Pak Kret City Municipality

Tambon of Nonthaburi province
Populated places in Nonthaburi province